Ida Henriette da Fonseca (July 27, 1802 – July 6, 1858) was a Danish opera singer and composer.

Ida Henriette da Fonseca was the daughter of Abraham da Fonseca (1776–1849) and Marie Sofie Kiærskou (1784–1863). She and her sister Emilie da Fonseca were students of Giuseppe Siboni, choir master of the Opera in Copenhagen. She was given a place at the royal Opera alongside her sister the same year she debuted in 1827.

She made tours in Europe in 1829 and 1833–34, performing in Hannover, Germany, the Netherlands, and Sweden, after which she was named one of the greatest singers in Scandinavia and prima donna, but as she was not a soprano but an alto, which was not fashionable at the time, she was in fact not given many parts at the Danish opera. She often performed breeches roles. She retired in 1840.

In 1841, she was named royal court singer at her request, as it would make it easier to get students: she was suffering from economical difficulties and worked as a singing teacher. She performed at court the last time in 1842. She was popular as a concert singer, however, and much active as such. In 1844-47, she visited Sweden and Norway. In 1848, she published her first composition, and became one of the first woman composers of her country.

See also
List of Danish composers

References
This article was initially translated from Ida Henriette da Fonseca on the Danish Wikipedia which lists the following sources:
Dansk biografisk Leksikon 1. udgave
Temaside på KB 
Kvindeleksikon
Gerhard Schepelern: Giuseppe Siboni. Et Afsnit af Operaens Historie ude og hjemme. 1-2 København 1989

External links
 

1802 births
1858 deaths
19th-century Danish women opera singers
Danish classical composers
Danish people of Portuguese descent
Women classical composers
19th-century classical composers
Danish operatic mezzo-sopranos
Singers from Copenhagen
Danish women composers
19th-century Danish composers
19th-century women composers